Aspremont is the name of 2 communes in France:

 Aspremont, Alpes-Maritimes, in the Alpes-Maritimes department
 Aspremont, Hautes-Alpes, in the Hautes-Alpes department

Other uses 
 Aspremont (chanson de geste),  an Old French chanson de geste about a battle at Aspromonte in Italy
 , a French noble family, originally from Apremont-la-Forêt

See also 
 Apremont (disambiguation)
 Aspromonte, a mountain massif in the province of Reggio Calabria, southern Italy